Amazon Silk is a web browser developed by Amazon. It was launched in November 2011 for Kindle Fire and Fire Phone, and a Fire TV version was launched in November 2017. The addition of Silk to the Echo Show was announced at an Amazon event in September 2018.

The browser uses a split architecture where some of the processing is performed on Amazon's servers to improve webpage loading performance. It is based on the open source Chromium project that uses the Blink and V8 engines.

Architecture
For each webpage, Silk decides which browser subsystems (networking, HTML or page rendering) to run locally on the device and which to run remotely on its own Amazon EC2 servers.

Silk uses Google's SPDY protocol to speed up loading of web pages. Silk gives SPDY performance improvements for non-SPDY optimized websites if the pages are sent through Amazon's servers. Some early reviewers found that cloud-based acceleration did not necessarily improve page loading speed, most notably on faster connections or for simpler web pages.

Some privacy organizations raised concerns with how Amazon passes Silk traffic via its servers, effectively operating as an Internet service provider for those using the browser. The Silk browser includes the option to turn off Amazon server-side processing. On July 26, 2016 it was reported that Silk prevents access to Google over HTTPS, but that bug has since been fixed.

Name
Amazon says "a thread of silk is an invisible yet incredibly strong connection between two different things", and thus calls the browser Amazon Silk as it is the connection between Kindle Fire and Amazon's EC2 servers.

See also
 History of web browsers
 List of web browsers
 Opera Mini 
 Opera Turbo
 MarioNet split web browser

References

Web browsers
Client/server split web browsers
Amazon (company)
Computer-related introductions in 2011